The Theban Tomb TT133 is located in Sheikh Abd el-Qurna. It forms part of the Theban Necropolis, situated on the west bank of the Nile opposite Luxor.

The tomb belongs to a 19th Dynasty ancient Egyptian named Neferronpet, who was a Chief of weavers in the Ramesseum in the estate of Amun on the west of Thebes during the reign of Ramesses II. Neferronpet's wife was named Hunero.

The tomb has an inscribed hall. Neferronpet and Hunero are depicted with a tree-goddess in one scene. A possible additional title for Neferronpet appears in the hall: Chief of the Carrying Chairs of the Kings in Southern and the Kings in Northern Egypt.

See also
 List of Theban tombs

References

Buildings and structures completed in the 13th century BC
Theban tombs